A declarator in Scottish law is a form of legal action by which some right of property, servitude, or status (or some other inferior right or interest) is sought to be judicially declared.

References

 Bell, Dictionary and Digest of the Laws of Scotland

Scots law legal terminology
Rights